Anaida or Anaida Parvaneh is an Indian performer, director, producer, and playback singer. She is now a chef and healer.

Background

A Parsee/Zoroastrian of Indian-Greek-Iranian heritage, she was one of India's first pop singers, in the 1990s. She has launched 10 albums and a score of singles, in Hindi, English, Tamil, Malayalam, Punjabi, Greek, and Arabic since then.

She has acted in Hindi movies and guest appearances in numerous television shows. She had worked in the 1995 movie Tum Karo Vaada.

Career
She was the first female Hindi pop artist to be featured on "Buddha bar" with her song "Good day to die" sung in English.
 She has performed around the world in different languages.

References

Further reading
  Profile, timesofindia.indiatimes.com, 15 January 2010.
 Profile, epaper.timesofindia.com; accessed 7 March 2018. 
 Profile, rediff.com; accessed 7 March 2018.

External links
 Official website

1980s births
Living people
Indian women playback singers
Indian women pop singers
21st-century Indian singers
Year of birth missing (living people)
Bollywood playback singers
21st-century Indian women singers